Robison is an English language patronymic surname, meaning "son of Rob" (a shortened form of Robert, of Norse Gaelic origin.) Robison is a rare given name.

Surname
Brian Robison (b. 1983), American football player
Ansel C. Robison and Ansel W. Robison, animal dealers in San Francisco
 Bruce Robison (b. ?), American singer, songwriter; brother of Charlie Robison
 Carson Robison (1890 - 1957), American singer, songwriter
 Charlie Robison (b. 1964), American singer, songwriter; brother of Bruce Robison
 Darrell Robison (1931–2002), American alpine skier
 David Fullerton Robison (1816 – 1859), American politician
 Emily Robison (b. 1972), American singer, songwriter
 Grant Robison (b. 1978), American track and field athlete
 Howard W. Robison (1915 - 1987), American politician
 James Robison (disambiguation)
 Jim Robison, American bridge player
Jim Robison (b. 1939), American ceramicist and sculptor
 Joel Walter Robison (1815 - 1889), leader in Texas independence and state representative for Fayette County
 John Elder Robison (b. 1957), American author
 John Robison (1739 – 1805), Scottish physicist
 Louise Y. Robison (1866 - 1946), American, general president of the Relief Society of The Church of Jesus Christ of Latter-day Saints 
 Mary Robison (b. 1949), American author
 Olin Clyde Robison (b. 1936), American, president of Middlebury College 
 Paula Robison (b. ?), American flutist
 Samuel Robison (1867 - 1952), American, Superintendent of the United States Naval Academy.
 Shona Robison (b. ?), member of the Scottish Parliament
 Stephanie Robison (b. 1976), American artist
 Tommy Robison (born 1961), American football player
 Willard Robison (1894 - 1968), American composer of popular song

Given name
 Robison Wells (b. 1978), American novelist

See also
 Roberson (surname)
 Robeson (disambiguation), includes a list of people with surname Roberson
 Robinson (name)

Masculine given names
Patronymic surnames
Surnames from given names